Join Dan Sartain is the fourth album by the Birmingham, Alabama rock musician Dan Sartain, released in 2006 by Swami Records. Several additional musicians recorded on the album, including Swami Records owner John Reis.

Several songs from the album were released as singles in the United Kingdom and charted on the Independent Singles chart there. "Replacement Man" reached #18, while "Flight of the Finch" reached #16 and "Thought it Over" reached #21. "Gun vs. Knife" was released as a single in the United States but did not chart.

Track listing

Performers
Dan Sartain - vocals, guitar
Raj Parmely - drums and percussion
Brian Moon - saxophone and xylophone on track 15
Al Sartain - backing vocals on track 7
Mariachi Real de San Diego - mariachi band on tracks 4 and 10
John Reis - organ, guitar, percussion and arrangements on tracks 4, 5, 6, 10, and 11; backing vocals on track 12; maracas on track 9
Gar Wood - backing vocals on track 13
Ben Moore - piano on track 5

Album information
Record label:Swami Records
Tracks 4, 5, 6, 10. and 11 recorded by Ben Moore
Tracks 2, 8, and 12 recorded by Liam Watson at Toe Rag studios
Tracks 7 and 15 recorded by Brian Moon in Birmingham, Alabama
Tracks 4, 5, 6, 10, and 11 arranged and produced by John Reis
Tracks 1, 3, 9, 13, and 14 recorded by Gar Wood at Strange Sounds studio
Mastered by Dave Gardner at Magneto Mastering
Portraits and artwork by Dan Sartain, based on photographs taken by Wez Frazer, Rachel Lipschwitz, Jonathan Purvis, and Johnny Donhowe
Layout by Joey Mansfield

2006 albums
Dan Sartain albums